Lewis Victor Heilbrunn (January 24, 1892 – October 1959) was an influential American biologist.

Heilbrunn was awarded a Guggenheim Fellowship in 1927, and on his return from Europe began teaching 
at the University of Pennsylvania, a position he would hold for 30 years.  His Outline of General Physiology (first edition 1937) became a standard foundational text in the field.

Selected works 
 The colloid chemistry of protoplasm, Berlin, Gebrüder Borntraeger, 1928
 An outline of general physiology, Philadelphia, W.B. Saunders, 1937 (second edition 1943; third edition 1952)
 Protoplasmatologia; Handbuch der Protoplasmaforschung, Vienna, Springer, 1953
 The dynamics of living protoplasm, New York, Academic Press 1956

External links
 Heilbrunn bio

1892 births
1959 deaths
People from Brooklyn
American biologists
Scientists from New York City
University of Pennsylvania faculty
20th-century biologists